Mexipuerto Cementos Fortaleza Cuatro Caminos is a shopping mall and public transportation terminal in Naucalpan, State of Mexico, part of Greater Mexico City. It is adjacent to Cuatro Caminos metro station. "Mexipuerto" refers to the public transportation station (known as CETRAMs in Mexico), "Cementos Fortaleza" is the company that has the naming rights, and "Cuatro Caminos" to the metro station and general area. Passengers can transfer between the adjacent metro and the peseros (minibuses) and regional buses that use the terminal. An aerial tramway to Palo Solo in Huixquilucan is to be added in the future. There is a 31,549-sq.-m. shopping center anchored by Sears, Sanborns and Cinemex and a 15-story residential tower on top.

References

External links
 

Shopping malls in Greater Mexico City
Naucalpan de Juárez
Shopping malls established in 2016
2016 establishments in Mexico